Charlie or Charley Hall may refer to:

Charlie Hall (baseball) (1863–1921), American baseball player
Charlie Hall (actor) (1899–1959), English movie actor
Charlie Hall (musician) (born 1973), Christian worship leader
Charlie Hall (defensive back) (1948–1998), American football player for the Green Bay Packers
Charlie Hall (linebacker) (born 1948), former American football player for the Cleveland Browns
Charlie Hall (politician) (1930–2014), American politician
Charley Hall (pitcher) (1884–1943), American professional baseball pitcher
Charley Hall (outfielder) (1923–1996), Negro league baseball player

See also
Charles Hall (disambiguation)